Tonita Peña (born May 10, 1893 in San Ildefonso – died September 9, 1949 in Santo Domingo Pueblo) born as Quah Ah (meaning white coral beads) but also used the name Tonita Vigil Peña and María Antonia Tonita Peña. Peña was a renowned Pueblo artist, specializing in pen and ink on paper embellished with watercolor. She was a well-known and influential Native American artist and art teacher of the early 1920s and 1930s.

Early life and education 
Tonita Peña was the daughter of Ascensión Vigil Peña and Natividad Peña of San Ildefonso Pueblo, New Mexico but at age 12, her mother and younger sister died, as a results of complications due to the flu. Her father was unable to care for her and she was taken to Cochití Pueblo and was brought up by her aunt, Martina Vigil Montoya, a prominent Cochití Pueblo potter. Peña attended St. Catherine Indian School in Santa Fe.

Career and later life 
Edgar Lee Hewett, an anthropologist involved in supervising the nearby Frijoles Canyon excavations (now Bandelier National Monument) was instrumental in developing the careers of several San Ildefonso “self taught” artists including Tonita Peña. Hewett purchased Peña's paintings for the Museum of New Mexico and supplied her with quality paint and paper. Peña began gaining more notoriety by the end of the 1910s selling an increasing amount to her work to collectors and the La Fonda Hotel. Much of this early work was done of traditional subject matter, in a style inspired by historic Native American works, however her use of an artists easel and western painting mediums gained her acceptance amongst her white contemporaries in the art world. At the age of 25 her work was being shown at museums and galleries in the Santa Fe and Albuquerque area. 

In the early 1920s Tonita did not know how much her painting sold for at the Museum of New Mexico so she wrote letters to the administrators because a local farmer was worried that she got paid too little.

In the 1930s Peña was an instructor at the Santa Fe Indian School and at the Albuquerque Indian School and the only woman painter of the San Ildefonso Self-Taught Group, which included such noted artists as Alfonso Roybal, Julian Martinez, Abel Sánchez (Oqwa Pi), Crecencio Martinez, and Encarnación Peña. As children, these artists attended San Ildefonso day school which was part of the institution of the Dawes Act of 1887, designed to indoctrinate and assimilate Native American children into mainstream American society.

In 1931, Tonita Peña exhibited at the Exposition of Indian Tribal Arts which was presented at the Grand Central Art Galleries in New York City. By 1932, the Whitney Museum in New York bought Peña's painting Basket Dance for $225. This was the highest price paid up to this time for a Pueblo painting and most Native American paintings at this time were selling between $2 to $25.

Peña's work was part of Stretching the Canvas: Eight Decades of Native Painting (2019–21), a survey at the National Museum of the American Indian George Gustav Heye Center in New York.

Death and legacy 
Peña died on September 9, 1949 of cancer after unsuccessful radiation therapy on her adrenal glands. At Peña's death, all of her remaining paintings and personal effects were burned in compliance with Pueblo customs.

Native arts (traditional crafts, dance, music as well as modern techniques like Peña's pen and ink with watercolor on paper) was a factor in modern Euro-Americans' changing perspective of the aesthetic and spiritual value of Native American culture and identity. Peña's artwork emphasized the role of women in everyday life and is credited with expanding the expectations of women in art by refusing to limit herself to the traditional female role of potter. Her son Joe Herrera, heavily influenced his mother, became an important figure in American modernism.

Peña's artwork is part of the collections at the American Museum of Natural History in New York, the Cleveland Museum of Art in Ohio, the Cranbrook Institute of Science in Michigan, the Heard Museum in Arizona, the Dartmouth College Collection in New Hampshire, the Haffenreffer Museum of Anthropology at Brown University, and the Peabody Museum at Harvard. She has continued to have national art exhibitions posthumously. 

A crater on the planet Venus has been named after Tonita Peña.

Affecting social change 
Peña did not accept the traditional roles of women in arts within Native American culture. She focused primarily on two-dimensional works on paper rather than the more socially accepted pottery and ceramic mediums of her contemporaries. Beyond the choice of what medium she used, Peña's subject matter also pushed gender boundaries. At the time she was active, only men were allowed to portray living individuals in their work. Another way Peña rejected traditional roles of women was how she approached her role as a mother. Contrary to the traditions of her tribe and America at large, she chose to have others raise some of her children, so that she could focus on completing her education and also furthering her career. During her lifetime, the U.S. government pushed the idea of assimilating Native Americans within American culture. Peña's artwork emerged as a site of resistance towards those efforts, reaffirming the importance of ceremonial dances as crucial for Puebloan cultural survival.

Critics 
Critique of Peña can be found within the framework of studying "traditional" Native American art, versus "White patronage" supported art of Native American art. Artwork made by Native Americans and collected by White patrons served no traditional function for in Native American communities. Peña's critics were not only the established art world, but also her own tribe. Many of Peña's paintings depicted sacred rituals and her fellow tribespeople believed these were inappropriate subject matters to portray and share outside the tribe. Epitacio Arquero, Governor of the Pueblo and Peña's husband at the time of the most heated protests, defended the subject matter saying her paintings only depicted subject matter already visible to outsiders. Following the controversy, Peña's work changed to focus on Pueblo culture and traditions that were not sacred or private in nature.

Personal life 
Tonita married three times and had six children. Peña's first marriage was in 1908 at the age of 15, arranged by village elders to Juan Rosario Chavez, however he died in 1912. She had two children with Chavez, and after he died she was able to leave the children temporarily with her aunt Martina Montoya, so she could finish her high school education. 

In 1913 Peña has a second arranged marriage to Felipe Herrera, who died in a mining accident in 1920. Her son Joe Hilario Herrera (with husband Felipe Herrera) was a notable painter. 

Her final marriage was in 1922 to Epitacio Arquero, a politician that important tribal offices at the Cochiti Pueblo, and together they had three children.

See also 
 Oasisamerica
 List of Native American artists
 Visual arts by indigenous peoples of the Americas

References

Further reading

 

1893 births
1949 deaths
Painters from New Mexico
Pueblo artists
American women painters
Native American painters
People from San Ildefonso Pueblo, New Mexico
20th-century American painters
20th-century American women artists
Native American women artists
20th-century indigenous painters of the Americas
20th-century Native Americans
20th-century Native American women